Julia Jacquette (born 1964) is an American artist primarily based in New York City and Amsterdam. She grew up in the Upper West Side by Columbus Avenue which was where her families apartment was. Jacquette studied at Skidmore College in Saratoga Springs, NY (1986) and Hunter College in New York City (1989–92).

Jacquette's work has been shown widely at galleries and museums around the world including Holly Solomon Gallery in New York City, David Klein Gallery in Birmingham, MI, the MoMA in New York, and Galerie Oliver Schweden in Munich, Germany. Her work is featured in several prestigious collections including the Museum of Modern Art in New York City, the National Museum of Women in the Arts, the Rhode Island School of Design Museum in Providence, RI, the Museum of Contemporary Art in Sydney, Australia and the Museum of Fine Arts in Boston.

She is a member of the board of directors of the MacDowell art colony in Peterborough, New Hampshire.

In 2017, Unrequited and Acts of Play, a retrospective exhibit, was mounted at the Wellin Museum in Clinton, New York. The exhibit featured site-specific murals, a variety of paintings, and a series of gouache drawings.

Jacquette has taught at the Rhode Island School of Design, Princeton University , and currently teaches at the Fashion Institute of Technology in NYC.

Her first major monograph is Unrequited and Acts of Play which describes and shows artistic explorations about the challenges of navigating the contemporary media landscape. Then her first graphic memoir is Playground of My Mind which is about her childhood in Manhattan in the 1960s and 1970s.

References

External links 
 Julia Jacquette (American, born 1964) at the MOMA
 JULIA JACQUETTE: ‘Water, Liquor, Hair’, New York Times review
 Julia Jacquette on artnet
, [Unrequited And Acts of Play]

1964 births
Artists from New York City
American women painters
Living people
Skidmore College alumni
21st-century American women artists